Marx Morris Twumasi (born 21 January 1980), known as Morris Babyface, is a Ghanaian music producer, singer and songwriter who hails from the Ashanti Region of Ghana. Morris is known to have recorded most prominent artist in Ghana with the likes of Pat Thomas, Kojo Antwi, Ofori Amponsah, A. B. Crentstil, Kontihene, Okomfoo Kwade3, Esther Smith, Nana Ama, Obrafour ,Lord Kenya etc.

Life and career 
Morris Babyface was born to the native palm-wine guitarist Kofi Twumasi of the Koo Nimo and his Adadammu fame. He has won the Ghana Music Awards' Best sound engineer twice.

References 

Ghanaian record producers
Living people
1980 births